Pharsalia saperdoides is a species of beetle in the family Cerambycidae. It was described by Francis Polkinghorne Pascoe in 1866. It is known from Sumatra, Malaysia, Borneo and Java.

References

saperdoides
Beetles described in 1866